Sergio dos Santos (born 1950) is a retired South African footballer who played as a midfielder for Hellenic, Cape Town Spurs and Kaizer Chiefs. He also managed Kaizer Chiefs for a spell in the mid-1990s.

Early life
He was born to Portuguese immigrants. He went to school at Brebner High School and Bloemfontein Commercial High.

Career
He joined the Greek Gods in 1968 and became their captain at the age of 22. He also went on to play for Cape Town Spurs and Kaizer Chiefs.

He has coached Engen Santos, Orlando Pirates, Hellenic, Cape Town Spurs, Ikapa Sporting and Kaizer Chiefs in 1993.

Post-retirement
He has worked as a Customer Relations Manager at Metro Cash and Carry, an Operations Manager at his own retail clothing company, Choice Clothing, a Western Cape ambassador for the 2010 FIFA World Cup and currently a Managing Partner at Kwantu Solutions.

He also works as a pundit for E.tv for UEFA Champions League matches.

References

External links
http://www.linkedin.com/pub/sergio-dos-santos/37/b44/636

1950 births
Living people
Association football midfielders
Kaizer Chiefs F.C. players
South African people of Portuguese descent
South African soccer players